Konstantinos Georgakopoulos (26 December 1890 – 26 July 1973)  was a Greek lawyer, politician and Prime Minister of Greece.

Biography
He was born in Tripoli, Greece, he studied law at the University of Athens. In 1915 he became a military court judge. In 1923 he left the military justice system with the rank of colonel. He subsequently served, until 1951, as lecturer in law in his former university.

In 1928 he joined the People's Party. From November 1935 to August 1936 he served as an under secretary in the cabinets of Konstantinos Demertzis and Ioannis Metaxas respectively. He was Minister for Education from August 1936 to November 1938 under Metaxas. In 1948 he became President of the Greek Red Cross.

From 5 March to 17 May 1958 he served as prime minister and Minister for the Interior in the caretaker government for the 1958 elections. He participated in many Board of directors organizations and was honored with many awards and medals. He died in Athens on July 26, 1973.

References

External links 
 The Ministers of the Metaxas Government
 Georgakopoulos's cabinet in 1958

1890 births
1973 deaths
20th-century prime ministers of Greece
20th-century Greek lawyers
Prime Ministers of Greece
Ministers of the Interior of Greece
National and Kapodistrian University of Athens alumni
People from Tripoli, Greece
People's Party (Greece) politicians
1950s in Greek politics
Grand Crosses with Star and Sash of the Order of Merit of the Federal Republic of Germany